Terminalia may refer to:

 Terminalia (festival), a Roman festival to the god of boundaries Terminus
 Terminalia (plant), a tree genus
 Terminalia (insect anatomy), the terminal region of the abdomen in insects
 Polyscias terminalia, a plant species in the genus Polyscias